The Mean One is a 2022 American Christmas black comedy slasher film directed by Steven LaMorte and written by Flip and Finn Kobler. The film serves as an unauthorized horror retelling of Dr. Seuss' 1957 children's book How the Grinch Stole Christmas! and stars David Howard Thornton as the eponymous character, with Krystle Martin, Chase Mullins, John Bigham, Erik Baker, Flip Kobler, and Amy Schumacher in supporting roles. It follows a young woman as she attempts to defend her childhood town from a green-skinned creature who goes on a murderous rampage during the holiday season.

The film was first announced on October 7, 2022, by XYZ Films, who collaborated with A Sleight of Hand Productions, Amy Rose Productions and Kali Pictures on its production. Because it is unauthorized, the film never uses the language of the original book.

The Mean One was released theatrically on December 9, 2022, to negative reviews from critics.

Premise 

In the sleepy mountain town of Newville, young Cindy You-Know-Who witnessed her mother murdered by the Mean One, a bloodthirsty green-skinned creature dressed in a red Santa suit. Twenty years later, Cindy and her father return to the town at the suggestion of Cindy's therapist. But when the ravenous monster soon begins to terrorize the town and threatens to ruin the holidays, Cindy finds a new purpose in stopping and killing the beast.

Cast 
 David Howard Thornton as the Mean One
 Krystle Martin as Cindy 
 Saphina Chanadet as young Cindy
 Chase Mullins as Officer Burke
 John Bigham as Doc Zeuss
 Erik Baker as Sheriff Hooper
 Flip Kobler as Lou 
 Amy Schumacher as Mayor McBean
 Christopher Sanders as narrator

Production 
On October 7, 2022, XYZ Films announced that they were collaborating with A Sleight of Hands Productions, Amy Rose Productions and Kali Pictures on distributing an unauthorized parody of Dr. Seuss's 1957 children's book How the Grinch Stole Christmas!, which would take place in a horror-like setting.

XYZ Films' Manager of Acquisitions and Development Alex Williams stated:

On November 23, 2022, it was announced that the film would theatrically debut on December 9, 2022, courtesy of Atlas Film Distribution, with XYZ Films no longer involved in the release of the film.

Release 
The Mean One was released theatrically in the United States on December 9, 2022.

Reception 
On the review aggregator website Rotten Tomatoes, the film holds an approval rating of 21% based on 19 reviews, with an average rating of 3.8/10. On Metacritic, the film has a weighted average score of 29 out of 100, based on 6 critics, indicating "generally unfavorable reviews". Matt Donato of IGN gave the film a 4 out of 10 rating, calling it "a rather inept slasher that ceremoniously wastes The Grinch as a slasher villain, thanks to some of the worst computer effects you'll find in the horror genre." He praised Thornton's performance as "the best part of The Mean One", but added that he is "handcuffed" by the film's low budget.

Vikram Murthi of IndieWire gave it a "D+" grade rating, writing: "While The Mean One wraps up in a predictable fashion, albeit with a somewhat reactionary message that calling out monstrous acts leads people (or Grinches?) to turn into murderous monsters, it also acknowledges social media's involvement in the film's existence. The Mean One originally was a trailer that ostensibly turned into a viral sensation, so much so that it motivated LaMorte to make a full-length feature. Sure enough, the film plays like a plodding, 90-minute version of a two-minute joke that doesn't even have the decency to be funny. A sight gag of a killer Grinch is good for a snort or a half-hearted chuckle. If you build a feature film around him, you become a Grinch yourself."

Alex DiVincenzo of Bloody Disgusting gave the film a 2.5 out of 5 rating, writing: "a concept this outrageous is begging to go full camp, but only occasional moments of self awareness shine among material that's otherwise played straight." He adds that "[a] majority of the performances border on melodramatic", while "Thornton carries the film on his back like a sack of presents."

See also 
 The Banana Splits Movie, a similar horror film also based on a children's franchise
 Winnie-the-Pooh: Blood and Honey, a similar horror film also based on a children's franchise
 Arthur, malédiction, a similar horror film also based on a children's franchise

References

External links
 

The Grinch (franchise)
2022 horror films
2022 independent films
2020s American films
2020s Christmas horror films
2020s parody films
2020s slasher films
American Christmas horror films
American independent films
American parody films
American slasher films
Films based on works by Dr. Seuss
Horror films based on children's franchises
Parodies of horror